Cattedown is an inner city suburb of Plymouth, Devon. Its position beside the River Plym estuary just short of the mouth led to its early settlement.

Catherine of Aragon - the first wife of Henry VIII - travelled from Loredo in Spain to a harbour in Plymouth, England to be married. She arrived in Plymouth on 2nd October 1501 where, 'she could not have been received with greater rejoicings'. The area that she disembarked or 'set down' was named in her honour as Cattedown. 

In 1886, two archaeologists discovered human bones while mining in a quarry.

They included the remains of many strange creatures – hyenas, bison, woolly rhinoceros and cave lions. Among the partial skeletons of 15 early humans was the famous ‘Cattedown Man’ – believed to be the city’s earliest known inhabitant and dating back 140,000 years. Archaeologists say he could potentially be the oldest human found in Britain. -

Today, the caves – listed as a national monument by Historic England – remain fenced off and kept out of sight. Plans to turn the area into a tourist and visitor attraction have not yet progressed; more than a decade after they were first mooted.

References

Suburbs of Plymouth, Devon